Zanesville Township (T10N R5W) is located in Montgomery County, Illinois. As of the 2010 census, its population was 491 and it contained 189 housing units.

Geography

Demographics

Adjacent townships
 Pitman Township (north)
 Harvel Township (northeast)
 Raymond Township (east)
 Butler Grove Township (southeast)
 North Litchfield Township (south)
 Honey Point Township, Macoupin County (southwest)
 Shaws Point Township, Macoupin County (west)
 Nilwood Township, Macoupin County (northwest)

References

External links
City-data.com
Illinois State Archives
Historical Society of Montgomery County

Townships in Montgomery County, Illinois
Townships in Illinois